Baltalimania is a genus of worms belonging to the family Isodiametridae.

Species:
 Baltalimania kosswigi Ax, 1959

References

Acoelomorphs